Bely Kolodez is a rural locality (a selo) and the administrative center of Belokolodezsky Rural Settlement, Veydelevsky District, Belgorod Oblast, Russia. In the 19th century the village was part of Belokolodezskaya volost, Valuysky Uyezd, Voronezh Governorate. The population was 1,465 as of 2010. There are 21 streets.

Geography 
Bely Kolodez is located 25 km southeast of Veydelevka (the district's administrative centre) by road.

References 

Rural localities in Veydelevsky District